The government of Great Britain was under the joint leadership of William Pitt the Elder (in the House of Commons) and William Cavendish, 4th Duke of Devonshire (in the House of Lords), between November 1756 and April 1757—when Pitt was dismissed by King George. The King disliked Pitt, but Pitt's influence in the Commons had led to his crucial appointment as Southern Secretary in a ministry nominally headed by Devonshire.

Ministry
Principal ministers of the Crown were as follows:

See also
 11th Parliament of Great Britain
 Whigs (British political party)

Notes

References

 
 
 

1756 in Great Britain
1757 in Great Britain
British ministries
Government
Ministries of George II of Great Britain
1750s in Great Britain